The Mattancherry Palace is a palace popularly known as the Dutch Palace, in Mattancherry, Kochi, in the Indian state of Kerala which features Kerala murals depicting portraits and exhibits of the Rajas of Kochi. The palace was included in the "tentative list" of UNESCO World Heritage Siteand hence it's yet to be in UNESCO. Despite the name Dutch Palace, the palace was built by the Portuguese Empire as a gift to the Kingdom of Cochin.

History
The Palace was built and gifted by the Portuguese as a present to the king of Cochin around 1545. The palace was built to appease the king after they plundered a temple nearby.
The landing of Vasco da Gama, the Portuguese explorer at Kappad in 1498 was welcomed by the Kochi rulers. They were given exclusive right to construct factories. The Portuguese repulsed the repeated attacks of the Zamorians and the Cochin  Rajas practically became vassals of the Portuguese. The influence of the Portuguese were supplanted by the Dutch and they took over Mattancherry in 1663. Subsequently, the area was taken over by Hyder Ali and still later by the British East India Company

The Palace
The palace is a quadrangular structure built in Nālukettu style, the traditional Kerala style of architecture, with a courtyard in the middle. Certain elements of architecture, as for example the nature of its arches and the proportion of its chambers are indicative of European influence in basic Nālukettu style.

Murals

The glory of the palace rests on the large number of murals, executed in the best traditions of Hindu temple art, which are religious, decorative and stylised. The murals have been painted in rich warm colours in tempera technique.

Other exhibits
Portraits of the Rajas of Cochin, from 1864 onwards, are displayed in what was once the Coronation Hall. These were painted by local artists in western style. The ceiling of the hall is decorated with floral designs in woodcraft. Amongst the other exhibits in the palace are an ivory palanquin, a howdah, royal umbrellas, ceremonial dress used by the royalty, coins, stamps and drawings.

Restoration
In 1951, Mattancherry Palace was restored and declared a centrally protected monument. The palace is already undergoing a second restoration by the Archaeological Survey of India.  The restoration will raise the historical structure to a building and a museum of an international standard, preserving its originality, yet highlighting the important facets, The palace is an architectural masterpiece showcasing the blend between colonial and Kerala architecture. The restoration aims at showcasing its true grandeur. The work which started in 2007 was scheduled to be completed by 2009.

Paradesi Synagogue

Nearby is the Paradesi Synagogue built in 1568. Alongside are the antique shops in the meandering alleys of Jew Town, most of whose inhabitants have since migrated to Israel. The Mattancherry jetty and bus stand are behind the Palace. The area is full of shops attracting tourists hunting for mementoes to carry back home.

Situated in between the Mattancherry Palace and the Paradesi Synagogue is the Pazhayannur Bhagavathy Temple, the ancestral deity or Paradevata of the Cochin Royal Family. The temple with royal patronage which shares its wall with the Jewish synagogue tells volumes about the religious tolerance and intercultural amity that existed during the time of the Kingdom of Cochin.

References

External links

Houses completed in 1555
Palaces in Kochi
Royal residences in India
Archaeological sites in Kerala
Museums in Kochi
Monuments of National Importance in Kerala
1555 establishments in India
Mattancherry
World Heritage Tentative List for India